Vidya Stokes (born 8 December 1927) is an active member of Indian National Congress from 1970 and of  Himachal Pradesh Congress Committee since 1974. She was an elected member of Himachal Pradesh Legislative Assembly in 1974, 1982, 1985, 1990, 1998, 2003, 2007 and 2012.

Personal life
She was born at Kotgarh village of Kumarsain tehsil in Shimla District of Himachal Pradesh, India on 8 December 1927. She is an under graduate and was educated at University of Delhi. 

She married Shri. Lal Chand Stokes who was a Horticulturist , social worker and Former MLA from Theog Assembly Constituency in 1972.

She is the daughter-in-law of noted social worker Satyananda Stokes (an American settled in India), who later became a pioneer in horticulture in Himachal Pradesh.
She has two sons and one daughter who live in the U.S.

Vidya Stokes at the age of 83 was elected Hockey India president on 5 August 2010 after defeating Pargat Singh.
Vidya Stokes's nomination was initially in violation of the age stipulation of 70 in the government guidelines.

She was a nominated member of All India Congress Committee, 1976. She was appointed General Secretary of Pradesh Congress Committee, 1977. She was the chairperson of Finance Committee of the Pradesh Congress during Lok Sabha General Elections, 1980.  She was the observer of All India Congress Committee for-
 Sikkim, Assembly elections, 1994,
 Re constitution of Congress Party in Assam, 1994,
 Elections to Punjab Legislative Assembly, 1997.
She also represented India in the Asian Women’s Co-operative Conference which was held at Kuala-Lumpur during the International Women's year, 1977. She served as the Director of the State Bank of India. She was in Delhi Board from 1973 until 1974. She remained the President of State Co-operative Union for a period of four years. She also served on the Editorial Board of the Co-operative Magazine. She is the vice-chairperson of National Farmers Forum and the President of State Unit of National Farmers Forum. She was the Vice- Chairperson of HPMC Limited from November 1980 to 14 November 1984. She was the President of Indian Women’s Hockey Association in 1984, 1988, 1994 and 2003. She represented India in various international sports events and accompanied the India women's national field hockey team during the World Cup held in Spain. She has continued in the post of State Chief Commissioner of The Scouts/Guides Organisation an organisation Member of World Federation of Independent Scouts, (WFIS) Germany. She is the oldest winner in Himachal Pradesh and has won in the assembly elections for the eighth time in the year 2012.

References

People from Shimla district
Women in Himachal Pradesh politics
Living people
Indian National Congress politicians from Himachal Pradesh
1927 births
Indian people of American descent
Indian sports executives and administrators
Himachal Pradesh MLAs 1972–1977
Himachal Pradesh MLAs 1982–1985
Himachal Pradesh MLAs 1985–1990
Himachal Pradesh MLAs 1990–1992
Himachal Pradesh MLAs 1998–2003
Himachal Pradesh MLAs 2003–2007
Himachal Pradesh MLAs 2007–2012
Himachal Pradesh MLAs 2012–2017
Indian female field hockey players
Field hockey players from Himachal Pradesh
Sportswomen from Himachal Pradesh
21st-century Indian women politicians
21st-century Indian politicians